Gemini Wing is a vertically scrolling shooter created by Tecmo and released in arcades in 1987. One or two players control a futuristic aircraft flying over terrain and shooting enemies of an animalistic or insectoid design.

Home conversions were released for the ZX Spectrum, Commodore 64, Amstrad CPC, Amiga, Atari ST, MSX, and X68000.

Reception 
In Japan, Game Machine listed Gemini Wing on their December 15, 1987 issue as being the eighth most-successful table arcade unit of the month.

References

External links

Gemini Wing at Lemon Amiga

Gemini Wing at Atari Mania

Tecmo games
1987 video games
Arcade video games
Vertically scrolling shooters
Amiga games
Amstrad CPC games
Atari ST games
Commodore 64 games
ZX Spectrum games
MSX games
Nintendo Switch games
PlayStation 4 games
X68000 games
Video games developed in Japan
Video games scored by Barry Leitch
Hamster Corporation games
Multiplayer and single-player video games